James Allen Korn (born July 28, 1957 in Hopkins, Minnesota), is an American former professional ice hockey defenceman. He played in the National Hockey League with five teams between 1979 and 1990. Internationally he played for the American national team at two World Championships.

Life and career
Korn moved to Minnetonka, Minnesota, at the age of 6 months with his family, where he grew up and attended Hopkins High School.

He was drafted in the fifth round, 73rd overall, by the Detroit Red Wings in the 1977 NHL Amateur Draft. He played for the Providence College Friars for four seasons, from 1975 to 1979, where he was a second team All American in his senior season. He played in the National Hockey League with the Red Wings, Toronto Maple Leafs, Buffalo Sabres, New Jersey Devils and Calgary Flames.

Korn was also drafted by the New England Whalers of the World Hockey Association, but he never played in that league.

In his NHL career, Korn appeared in 597 games. He scored 66 goals and added 122 assists. He also recorded 1,801 penalty minutes.

Career statistics

Regular season and playoffs

International

Awards and honors

References

External links
 

1957 births
Living people
Adirondack Red Wings players
American men's ice hockey defensemen
Buffalo Sabres players
Calgary Flames players
Detroit Red Wings draft picks
Detroit Red Wings players
Hopkins High School alumni
Ice hockey players from Minnesota
New England Whalers draft picks
New Jersey Devils players
People from Hopkins, Minnesota
People from Minnetonka, Minnesota
Providence Friars men's ice hockey players
Toronto Maple Leafs players